Little 'Tinker is a 1948 MGM cartoon directed by Tex Avery. It was produced by Fred Quimby with the soundtrack composed by Scott Bradley.

Plot
The story begins at the home of B.O. Skunk, which contains many fans. B.O. takes a shower with O-Bouy soap (a parody of Lifebuoy soap, complete with its jingle) and overly douses himself with expiring perfume.

Then he goes out for a walk. The flowers along the path from his home wither and fall as he passes them. As B.O. walks to the forest, he sees a pretty squirrel who calls him closer. But as B.O. goes to the squirrel with wilted flowers and she smells his stench, she runs out to her home and puts up a sign that reads "NO VACANCY". The point is that B.O. has an offensive odor from which everyone runs. B.O. then sees a pretty female rabbit. He first gives her a flower to smell, and then substitutes himself. The female rabbit screams in horror and runs into her hole and "zips" it. B.O. cries, not knowing what to do.

Then, Cupid appears and gives the skunk a book: "Advice to the Love-Lorn" by Beatrice Bare Fax (a reference to famed newspaper advice columnist Beatrice Fairfax). The first chapter says to try the great lover routine. B.O. then goes to another female squirrel sitting on a branch and attracts her by speaking in the manner of Charles Boyer. All goes well until the squirrel smells B.O. and runs away. B.O., thinking he is kissing the squirrel, kisses the branches of the tree and then a sleepy owl. The owl falls onto the ground, unconscious.

The second chapter says to try the balcony routine. B.O. dresses like Romeo and climbs a tree to serenade a female raccoon with a part of the sextet, "Chi mi frena in tal momento" from Act II of Gaetano Donizetti's Lucia di Lammermoor. At first, the raccoon is attracted to B.O.'s wooing, but when she smells him, she throws a pot at him, sending B.O. falling into a nearby pond. Even the fish are repelled by B.O.'s smell and then they run away from the pond.

Then, a big female rabbit goes to B.O., grabs him and wants to kiss him. But even she runs from his smell and tosses B.O. into a trash can and hides herself in a rabbit hole, which moves as she flees.

The next chapter of book says "Swoon 'em!" B.O. then gets a Frank Sinatra suit and pours water on it to shrink it to fit him. Then, B.O.-Sinatra sings "Rhapsody in Pew" (really All or Nothing at All, sung by Bill Roberts). All the females in the forest run to hear B.O.'s singing. All of them swoon, and even an old female rabbit jumps in the air and yells "FRANKIE!" B.O. continues to sing with more gags and then ends as all the females jump on him. But then they all run out, having detected his smell.

Despairing, B.O. then attempts suicide by drinking a bottle of poison because no one loves him. But Cupid stops him and shows the last piece of advice: camouflage! B.O. then sees a pretty fox and disguises himself as a male fox. B.O. whistles to the fox. The fox likes B.O. and she kisses him. B.O. is excited and then walks with the fox on a trunk lying horizontally above the river. B.O. and the fox then lose their balance and fall into the river. Downcast, B.O. thinks that now the fox will run away from him, as the paint has washed out. But the "fox" is really a painted skunk too, as is revealed when paint washes out of her fur.

Now aware that they are both skunks, they kiss longingly. Iris out, and B.O. throws the advice book out of the scene.

Voice cast
Walter Craig as B.O. Skunk
Bill Roberts as the singing voice of B.O. Skunk in balcony scene and Frank Sinatra scene
Dick Nelson as the Cupid
Sara Berner as the Rabbits
Lillian Randolph as the Black Rabbit
William Hanna as yelling sounds

See also
Pepé Le Pew - a character with an identical premise from competitor Warner Bros.

Notes
 The black rabbit in the Frank Sinatra scene (who says, "Love dat man") has been edited out of some copies for stereotypical reasons.

References

External links

Little 'Tinker at the Big Cartoon DataBase

1948 animated films
1948 short films
1948 films
1940s American animated films
1940s animated short films
Metro-Goldwyn-Mayer animated short films
Films directed by Tex Avery
Cultural depictions of Frank Sinatra
Films scored by Scott Bradley
Films about skunks
Films with screenplays by Henry Wilson Allen
Films produced by Fred Quimby
Metro-Goldwyn-Mayer cartoon studio short films